Graham Douglas (born 13 May 1945) is a New Zealand cricketer. He played in ten first-class matches for Central Districts from 1965 to 1968.

See also
 List of Central Districts representative cricketers

References

External links
 

1945 births
Living people
New Zealand cricketers
Central Districts cricketers
Cricketers from Nelson, New Zealand